Abdulhamid Bey Sharif Bey oglu Gaytabashi (1884 - June, 1920) was the last Chief of General Staff of Azerbaijani Armed Forces of Azerbaijan Democratic Republic before its occupation by the Red Army in April 1920.

Early life
Abdulmajid Bey who was the great grandfather of Abdulhamid moved from Istanbul to Tiflis at the end of the 18th century and started his service in the Russian Imperial Army. While in the Ottoman Army Abdulmajid had been in charge of a regiment and was therefore named Haytabashi, later transliterated by Russians to Qaytabashi and assigned to him as his title. Abdulhamid's father, Lieutenant colonel Sharif Bey Gaytabashi served as a translator in the Documentation Department of the Russian Army in Caucasus and in the Caucasian Cavalry. Abdulhamid was his seventh child born during Sharif Bey's second marriage. 
Abdulhamid graduated from Pavlovsk Military College in 1908. As second lieutenant, he was assigned to the 261st Shemakha reserve infantry unit deployed in Elisabethpol. When World War I started, Gaytabashi served in the 205th infantry regiment of the 52nd infantry division of the 3rd Caucasus Corps. For his excellence on the battlefield, Stabskapitän Gaytabashi was conferred with the Order of St. Vladimir of 4th degree.

Service in Azerbaijani Army
Gaytabashi started his service in the Azerbaijani Armed Forces as an on-duty field-officer in the army corps. In January 1919, he was a member of Commission for Development of Army Units and Management of Military Office of Azerbaijan Democratic Republic. On June 25, 1919 Gaytabashi was promoted to Major General and was subsequently appointed Chief of General Staff of Azerbaijani Armed Forces in December 1919. He was considered one of the most experienced military experts of the armed forces.
After occupation of Azerbaijan by Bolsheviks, he was appointed Chief of General Staff of the Red Army Corps in Azerbaijan. However, in June, 1920 he was executed by firing squad for his alleged role in Ganja revolt.

See also
Azerbaijani Army
Ministers of Defense of Azerbaijan Republic

References

1884 births
1920 deaths
Generals of the Azerbaijan Democratic Republic
Azerbaijani military personnel of World War I
Azerbaijani military personnel of the Armenian–Azerbaijani War (1918–1920)
Chiefs of General Staff of Azerbaijani Armed Forces
Executed Azerbaijani people
Military personnel from Tbilisi
People executed by Russia by firing squad
20th-century executions by Russia
Executed people from Georgia (country)
Azerbaijani generals of Imperial Russian Army
Azerbaijani people of World War I